Team Ghinzani is a motor racing team based in Italy, involved in many areas of motorsport.

History 

Team Ghinzani have raced in Italian, German and Formula 3 Euro Series since 2000. Ghinzani entered Italian Formula 3000/Euro Formula 3000 between 1999 and 2002.

Since 2005–06 season, the outfit has managed A1 Team Italy in collaboration with Arco Motorsport, in the A1 Grand Prix series.

Results 

 † These drivers also drove for other teams during the season and their final positions include all team results.
 D.C. = Drivers' Championship position, T.C. = Teams' Championship position.

Timeline

References

External links 
  teamghinzani.it
 A1 Team Italy at a1gp.com Italy.a1gp.com

1992 establishments in Italy
Italian auto racing teams
A1 Grand Prix racing teams
Formula 3 Euro Series teams
Auto GP teams
Auto racing teams established in 1992
Italian Formula 3 teams
German Formula 3 teams
Porsche Supercup teams
Acceleration teams